Sir John Greer Dill,  (25 December 1881 – 4 November 1944) was a senior British Army officer with service in both the First World War and the Second World War. From May 1940 to December 1941 he was the Chief of the Imperial General Staff (CIGS), the professional head of the British Army, and subsequently served in Washington, D.C., as Chief of the British Joint Staff Mission and then Senior British Representative on the Combined Chiefs of Staff (CCS).

Early life
Born in Lurgan, County Armagh, Ireland in 1881, Dill's father was the local bank manager and his mother was a Greer from Woodville, Lurgan. Always intended for a career in the services, Dill attended the Methodist College Belfast, Cheltenham College in England and the Royal Military College at Sandhurst.

Military career
From Sandhurst Dill was commissioned on 8 May 1901 as a second lieutenant into the 1st Battalion of the Leinster Regiment and was posted to South Africa to see out the Second Boer War. After the end of the war in June 1902, Dill left Cape Town with other men of his battalion on the SS Englishman in late September 1902, arriving at Southampton the following month, from where they were posted to Fermoy.
Dill was appointed regimental adjutant on 15 August 1906, having previously been assistant adjutant from 1902. Promoted to captain on 12 July 1911, he was seconded to study at the Staff College, Camberley from 1 February 1913, and was still there on the outbreak of the First World War eighteen months later.

First World War
After briefly serving on the staff of Southern Command Dill became brigade major of the 25th Brigade (8th Division) in France where he was present at Neuve Chapelle and won the Distinguished Service Order. During 1916 Dill served on the General Staff of the 55th Division and Canadian Corps, before being promoted to Lieutenant-Colonel and Chief of Staff (GSO1) of the 37th Division in January 1917. He was moved to the General Staff at General Headquarters in October of that year, initially as part of the Training Section but was soon shifted to the Operations Section. By the end of the war he was a brigadier general and had been Mentioned in Despatches eight times. From the spring of 1918 he was Head of Operations at GHQ, an important promotion after the sacking of many of Field Marshal Sir Douglas Haig's senior staff following the Battle of Cambrai. He was appointed a Companion of the Order of St Michael and St George (CMG) in the 1918 New Year Honours. He also received a number of foreign decorations for his service, including the Officer of the Legion of Honour, the French Croix de guerre, Commander of the Order of the Crown of Belgium, Officer of the Order of the Crown of Romania.

Between the wars
After the war Dill returned to the Staff College and served as an instructor there. In the 1928 New Year Honours he was appointed a Companion of the Order of the Bath (CB). In 1929 he was posted to India and in 1930 was promoted to major-general before returning to appointments at the Staff College (for in fact the third time but this time as Commandant) and then to the War Office as Director of Military Operations and Intelligence, holding that post until 1 September 1936. Alongside his other positions, he was appointed to the largely honorary role of Colonel of the East Lancashire Regiment on 24 December 1932, a position he held until his death.

Following his service on the General Staff, Dill was sent to Palestine, during the Arab revolt, where he was appointed General Officer Commanding (GOC) of the British forces in Palestine on 8 September 1936, holding the post until 1937. He was knighted in the 1937 Coronation Honours with his promotion to Knight Commander of the Order of the Bath (KCB), and he was then appointed General Officer Commanding, Aldershot Command. The same year he was interviewed by Leslie Hore-Belisha, Secretary of State for War, for the post of Chief of the Imperial General Staff, but lost out to Lord Gort who was almost five years his junior.

Second World War

At the outbreak of the Second World War Dill hoped to be appointed Commander-in-Chief of the British Expeditionary Force, but the position again went to Gort. The resulting vacancy as Chief of the Imperial General Staff (CIGS) was filled by Sir Edmund Ironside, leaving Dill to be eventually posted as commander of I Corps in France on 3 September 1939. He was promoted to general on 1 October 1939 (with seniority backdated to 5 December 1937).

On returning to the UK in April 1940, Dill was appointed Vice Chief of the Imperial General Staff (and a member of the Army Council), under Ironside, by the then Prime Minister Neville Chamberlain. On 27 May 1940, after Chamberlain had been replaced by Churchill, Dill replaced Ironside as CIGS.

Faced with the prospect of a German invasion, Dill produced a memorandum on 15 June advocating the use of chemical warfare against an enemy landing. Although acknowledging that first use of chemical weapons would alienate the United States and invite retaliation, he concluded that "at a time when our National existence is at stake ... we should not hesitate to adopt whatever means appear to offer the best chance of success."

After criticism from the Director of Home Defence and other offices Dill withdrew the memorandum. Nevertheless, the proposal was largely endorsed by Churchill on 30 June and it was ordered that the Royal Air Force begin preparations for deploying mustard gas, although he added that actual employment would need to be ordered by Cabinet.

Dill was promoted field marshal on 18 November 1941, but by this time it was clear how poorly he and Churchill got on. Dill gained a reputation as unimaginative and obstructionist. Keen to get him out of the way, Churchill at the end of 1941 had Dill advanced to Knight Grand Cross of the Order of the Bath (GCB) and posted him to Washington, D.C. as his personal representative where he became Chief of the British Joint Staff Mission, then Senior British Representative on the Combined Chiefs of Staff. Dill showed a great flair as a diplomatic military presence. In 1943 alone he attended the Quebec Conference, the Casablanca Conference, the Tehran Conference and meetings in India, China and Brazil. He also served on the Combined Policy Committee set up by the British and United States governments under the Quebec Agreement to oversee the construction of the atomic bomb. He was awarded the Henry Howland Memorial Prize in 1944, in part to ensure his continued favour with Churchill.

In the United States he was immensely important in making the Chiefs of Staff committee – which included members from both countries – function, often promoting unity of action. He was particularly friendly with General George Marshall and the two exercised a great deal of influence on President Roosevelt who described Dill as "the most important figure in the remarkable accord which has been developed in the combined operations of our two countries".

Death

Dill served in Washington until his death from aplastic anaemia in November 1944. His funeral arrangements reflected the great professional and personal respect and affection that he had earned. A memorial service was held in Washington National Cathedral and the route of the cortege was lined by some thousands of troops, following which he was interred in Arlington National Cemetery, where a simple service was conducted at the graveside.  A witness recorded that "I have never seen so many men so visibly shaken by sadness. [General George] Marshall's face was truly stricken ...". He was sorely missed by the American Joint Chiefs of Staff, who sent a warm message of condolence to their British colleagues:

Dill was posthumously awarded the American Army Distinguished Service Medal in 1944 as well as receiving an unprecedented joint resolution of the United States Congress appreciating his services. He was buried at Arlington National Cemetery, in Arlington, Virginia. The equestrian statue on Dill's grave is one of only two at the cemetery, the other is Major-General Philip Kearny's.

References

Bibliography

Further reading
 Danchev, Alex. "Very Special Relationship: Field Marshal Sir John Dill and General George Marshall."  online
 Danchev, Alex. "'Dilly-Dally', or Having the Last Word: Field Marshal Sir John Dill and Prime Minister Winston Churchill." Journal of Contemporary History 22.1 (1987): 21–44.

External links

British Army Officers 1939–1945
CWGC: John Dill
Generals of World War II

|-

|-

|-

|-

|-

|-

|-

|-

1881 births
1944 deaths
British Army generals of World War I
British Empire in World War II
British Army personnel killed in World War II
British field marshals of World War II
British military personnel of the 1936–1939 Arab revolt in Palestine
Burials at Arlington National Cemetery
Chiefs of the Imperial General Staff
Commandants of the Staff College, Camberley
Companions of the Distinguished Service Order
Commanders of the Order of the Crown (Belgium)
Companions of the Order of St Michael and St George
Graduates of the Royal Military College, Sandhurst
Graduates of the Staff College, Camberley
Grand Crosses of the Order of Polonia Restituta
Knights Grand Cross of the Order of the Bath
Officiers of the Légion d'honneur
Officers of the Order of the Crown (Romania)
People educated at Cheltenham College
People educated at Methodist College Belfast
People from Lurgan
Prince of Wales's Leinster Regiment officers
Recipients of the Croix de guerre (Belgium)
Recipients of the Croix de Guerre 1914–1918 (France)
Recipients of the Distinguished Service Medal (US Army)
War Office personnel in World War II
Foreign recipients of the Distinguished Service Medal (United States)
British military attachés
Military personnel from County Armagh
Academics of the Staff College, Camberley